Bayazeh (also Romanized as Bayāẕeh, Bayāzeh, and Baiāzeh; also known as Bayāzīyeh and Bīabānāk) is a village in Nakhlestan Rural District, in the Central District of Khur and Biabanak County, Isfahan Province, Iran. It was founded more than 2,500 years ago.

At the 2006 census, its population was 319 people, in 103 families.

According to some reports, the population of this village had been around 5,000 people in the past. Bayazeh has been known as the cultural and scientific center of this part of the desert. Many greats and scientists have lived there.

Saghafi' (from Mukhtar Saghafi) have been the most famous family in this village.

An ancient old castle (remaining from the Sasanian empire or before), mosques, houses, covered narrow alleys, and a qanat, are all sites that attract tourists.

References 

Populated places in Khur and Biabanak County